Beneath Ceaseless Skies (BCS) is a fantasy adventure online magazine published in the United States by Firkin Press.

History
Beneath Ceaseless Skies first issue was released on October 9, 2008 featuring stories by Chris Willrich and David D. Levine. It was the runner-up for the 2008 Million Writers Award for the Best New Online Magazine, losing to Cha: An Asian Literary Journal. In 2010 Beneath Ceaseless Skies became a SFWA qualifying venue for short fiction and on February 10 they released e-book anthology, entitled The Best of Beneath Ceaseless Skies Online Magazine, Year One, which contained 14 stories which had been previously published in the magazine. Selected stories are also published as audio fiction podcasts. Many of the stories featured in Beneath Ceaseless Skies have received praise and honourable mentions from reviewers such as Rich Horton and Lois Tilton. Issue 24 featured "Father's Kill" by Christopher Green which won the 2009 Aurealis Award for best fantasy short story.

Firkin Press
Firkin Press is a non-profit organisation aimed at promoting science-fiction and fantasy short literature.

Notable stories featured
"Father's Kill" by Christopher Green in issue #24 won the 2009 Aurealis Award for best fantasy short story
"The Telling" by Gregory Norman Bossert in issue #109 won the 2013 World Fantasy Award for Best Short Story

Awards

 2017 World Fantasy Award for Scott H. Andrews for Special Award, Non-Professional for Beneath Ceaseless Skies

References

External links
Official website

Literary magazines published in the United States
Online magazines published in the United States
Fantasy fiction magazines
Biweekly magazines published in the United States
Magazines established in 2008
Magazines published in Virginia
Fantasy short stories